Ian Spittal (born 14 February 1965 in Glasgow), is a Scottish former footballer. He was a defender.

Spittal began his career with Partick Thistle, and went on to have spells at Stranraer and Arbroath. Spittal then joined junior side Pollok, before returning to the senior game with Clyde, signing along with 10 other players plucked from the junior ranks. Spittal was quickly appointed captain, a position which he held until his early retirement from football in November 1999 due to an eye injury. He was appointed coach of the Clyde reserve team, before returning to Pollok in 2001 as a coach.

External links

Living people
1965 births
Footballers from Glasgow
Scottish footballers
Arbroath F.C. players
Clyde F.C. players
Clyde F.C. non-playing staff
Partick Thistle F.C. players
Stranraer F.C. players
Scottish Football League players
Pollok F.C. players
Association football defenders
Scottish Junior Football Association players